The 73rd annual Berlin International Film Festival, usually called the Berlinale, took place from 16 to 26 February 2023. It was the first completely in-person Berlinale since the 70th in 2020. The festival has added a new award for best television series this year. On 15 December 2022, the first Panorama and Generation titles for the festival were announced, and on 13 January 2023, many world premieres were added to out-of-competition lineup, including Israeli filmmaker Guy Nattiv's Golda—a biographical film about Golda Meir, first female Prime Minister of Israel.

The festival opened with American filmmaker and novelist Rebecca Miller's drama film She Came to Me. A live video stream with Ukrainian President Volodymyr Zelenskyy was part of the opening ceremony. On 21 February 2023, American filmmaker Steven Spielberg was presented with the Honorary Golden Bear for lifetime achievement by Irish singer-songwriter Bono. Spielberg's films were screened in the Homage section for the occasion. The Silver Bear Grand Jury Prize was awarded to Afire by German filmmaker Christian Petzold. The highlight of the award ceremony was the Silver Bear for Best Leading Performance won by Sofía Otero for the role of eight-year-old Lucía in 20,000 Species of Bees; Otero, at age nine, became the youngest winner of the award in the Berlinale history.

Festival closed on 26 February with total sales of tickets touching 320,000, and around 20,000 accredited professionals from 132 countries including 2,800 media representatives attending the festival.

Background

The film registration for the festival began in September 2022 with the closing date for submission fixed on 23 November 2022. On 13 October 2022, with the slogan of "Let's Get Together", signifying in-person interactions in all the programmes of the festival after two years of the programmes held online due to COVID-19. It was also announced that Berlinale Series Award would be inaugurated in 2023.

The festival poster was designed by Claudia Schramke, who had also created the previous year's Berlinale poster. The executive director of the Berlinale, described the poster as the key visual for the 2023 Berlinale, saying that it directed the attention toward the audience—the indispensable core of the festival. Rissenbeek said, "We’re very pleased that with this year's poster, we can honour those whose curiosity, enthusiasm, and applause make the Berlinale a vibrant, inspiring, and joyful event."

Opening and closing ceremonies

The opening ceremony of the festival was held on 16 February with jury members and international and German stars walking the red carpet. The jury president Kristen Stewart, in her opening speech, pointed out about "oppressions against our physical selves". She said that, albeit she was a woman, she represented "the least marginal version of a woman". On that topic, Golshifteh Farahani, Iranian-French actress and one of the jury members, noted that "some women are not as fortunate."

Russia's war on Ukraine and Human rights in the Islamic Republic of Iran were topical discussions at the ceremony. After Ukrainian President Volodymyr Zelenskyy appeared via satellite and introduced by American actor and filmmaker Sean Penn, Zelenskyy remarked, "A logical question comes up: On which side should culture and art be?" and added, "Can art be outside of politics? Should cinema be outside of politics? It's an eternal question but today it is extremely [pertinent]." Afterward, the opening film of the festival, Rebecca Miller's drama film She Came to Me, was screened.

The closing ceremony or award night was held on 25 February, hosted by the German radio and television presenter Hadnet Tesfai. French documentary film On the Adamant, about a Paris daycare centre for people with mental disorders, by Nicolas Philibert won the Golden Bear. Stewart called the film "masterfully crafted" and a "cinematic proof of the vital necessity of human expression." Philibert asked in his acceptance speech if the jury members were "crazy" and yet nevertheless thanked them, saying "that documentary can be considered to be cinema in its own right touches me deeply." 

The Silver Bear Grand Jury Prize was won by Afire by Christian Petzold. Sofía Otero, a nine-year-old girl was the winner of Silver Bear for Best Leading Performance for the role of eight-year-old Lucía in 20,000 Species of Bees. She became the youngest winner of the gender-neutral award in the Berlinale history. Stewart commented that Otero had defied "a system designed to diminish the intelligence of the performer", particularly that of child performers. After the ceremony, Otero said to the press that she wanted to dedicate her life to acting. The ceremony closed with a screening of the Golden-Bear winning film On the Adamant.

Jury
Sources:

Competition

The following were on the jury for the Berlinale Competition section:
 Kristen Stewart, American actor, director, and screenwriter - Jury President
 Golshifteh Farahani, Iranian-French actor  
 Valeska Grisebach, German director and screenwriter 
 Radu Jude, Romanian director and screenwriter
 Francine Maisler, casting director and producer (United States)
 Carla Simón, Spanish director and screenwriter 
 Johnnie To, Hong Kong director and producer

Encounters

The following people were on the jury for the Encounters Awards:

 Angeliki Papoulia, Greek actress and theatre director  
 Dea Kulumbegashvili, Georgian film director and writer
 , Italian festival programmer and academic

International Short Film jury

 Cătălin Cristuțiu, Romanian editor
 Sky Hopinka, American visual artist and filmmaker 
 , German director and screenwriter

Generation Kplus International jury
 Venice Atienza, Filipino documentarist 
 Alise Ģelze, Latvian producer  
 Gudrun Sommer, German festival programmer

Generation 14plus International jury

 Kateryna Gornostai, Ukrainian film director, screenwriter and film editor
 Fion Mutert, German cinematographer and media educator  
 Juanita Onzaga, Colombian filmmaker and artist

GWFF Best First Feature Award jury
 Judith Revault d’Allonnes, French festival programmer 
 Ayten Amin, Egyptian director 
 , Swiss film director

Documentary Award jury

 Emilie Bujès, artistic director of Switzerland’s Visions du Réel
 Diana Bustamante, Colombian producer, director and programmer 
 Mark Cousins, Northern Irish director and writer

Berlinale Series Award jury
The jury for the Berlinale Series Award consists of:

 André Holland, American actor
 Danna Stern, Israeli international executive, founder of Shtisel and Your Honor firm, Yes Studios
 Mette Heeno, Danish screenwriter, showrunner and executive producer

Perspektive Deutsches Kino section jury
 Dela Dabulamanzi, German actor
 Anne Fabini, German film editor
 , Swedish director

Heiner Carow Prize jury
 Freya Arde, German film composer, guitarist and music producer
 , German director
 Mirko Wiermann, German film archivist .

Competition

The following 19 films were selected for the main competition for the Golden Bear and Silver Bear awards:
Highlighted title indicates award winner.

Encounters
The following 16 films are selected for the Encounters section:
Highlighted title indicates award winner.

Berlinale Special

Panorama
The following films are selected for the Panorama section:
Highlighted title indicates award winner.

Perspektive Deutsches Kino

The following films are selected for the Perspektive Deutsches Kino section:

Forum
The following films are selected for the Forum section:

Generation

Generation Kplus

Generation 14plus

Homage films

This section of the 73rd Berlinale was dedicated to American filmmaker, screenwriter, and producer Steven Spielberg, who was awarded an Honorary Golden Bear for lifetime achievement.

The Retrospective
This section presented the following films:

The Classics
A 4K restoration of David Cronenberg’s Naked Lunch opened the classics section.

Awards
Competition

 Golden Bear: On the Adamant by Nicolas Philibert
 Silver Bear Grand Jury Prize: Afire by Christian Petzold
 Silver Bear Jury Prize: Bad Living by João Canijo
 Silver Bear for Best Director: Philippe Garrel for The Plough
 Silver Bear for Best Leading Performance: Sofía Otero for 20,000 Species of Bees
 Silver Bear for Best Supporting Performance: Thea Ehre for Till the End of the Night
 Silver Bear for Best Screenplay: Angela Schanelec for Music
 Silver Bear for Outstanding Artistic Contribution: Hélène Louvart for Disco Boy (cinematography)

 Encounters

 Best Film: Here by Bas Devos
 Best Director: Tatiana Huezo for The Echo
 Special Jury Award: Orlando, My Political Biography by Paul B. Preciado and Samsara by Lois Patiño
International Short Film
 Golden Bear: Les Chenilles by Michelle Keserwany, Noel Keserwany
 Silver Bear: Dipped in Black by Matthew Thorne, Derik Lynch
 Special Mention: It’s a Date by Nadia Parfan

Generation

Youth Jury Awards
 Crystal Bear for the Best Film: Adolfo by Sofía Auza
 Special Mention: And the King Said, What a Fantastic Machine by Axel Danielson and Maximilien Van Aertryck
 Crystal Bear for the Best Short Film: And Me, I'm Dancing Too (Man khod, man ham miraghsam) by Mohammad Valizadegan
 Special Mention: From the Corner of My Eyes (Szemem sarka) by Domonkos Erhardt
Generation 14plus
 Grand Prix: Hummingbirds by Silvia Del Carmen Castaños, Estefanía “Beba” Contreras
 Special Mention: Mutt by Vuk Lungulov-Klotz
 Special Prize for the Best Short Film: Infantry (Infantaria) by Laís Santos Araújo
 Special Mention: Incroci by Francesca de Fusco

Other Berlinale awards

Berlinale Series Award
 Berlinale Series Award: The Good Mothers by Elisa Amoruso and Julian Jarrold
 Jury Special Mention: The Architect (Arkitekten) by 

The Perspektive Deutsches Kino Award

 Compass-Perspektive-Award: Seven Winters in Tehran by Steffi Niederzoll
 Honorable Mention: The Kidnapping of the Bride (El secuestro de la novia) by Sophia Mocorrea
 Kompagnon Fellowships: 
Paraphrase on the Finding of a Glove by Mareike Wegener 
 My Beloved Man’s Female Body by Anna Melikova 
 Heiner Carow Prize: Bones and Names by Fabian Stumm
 GWFF Best First Feature Award: The Klezmer Project by Leandro Koch, Paloma Schachmann

Documentary Award

 Berlinale Documentary Award: The Echo by Tatiana Huezo

Panorama Audience Award

Panorama Audience Award 2023 winner – Feature film
 1st place: Sira by Apolline Traoré
 2nd place: The Burdened by Amr Gamal
 3rd place: Midwives (Sages-femmes) by Léa Fehner

Panorama Audience Award Winner – Documentary
 1st place: Kokomo City by D. Smith
 2nd place: The Eternal Memory by Maite Alberdi
 3rd place: The Cemetery of Cinema (Au cimetière de la pelliculle) by Thierno Souleymane Diallo

Honorary awards

 Honorary Golden Bear: Steven Spielberg
 Berlinale Camera award for lifetime achievement: Caroline Champetier

Independent awards

Teddy Award

 Best Feature Film: All the Colours of the World Are Between Black and White by Babatunde Apalowo
 Best Documentary Film: Orlando, My Political Biography by Paul B. Preciado
 Jury Award: Vicky Knight as Franky for Silver Haze by Sacha Polak
 Best Short Film: Dipped in Black by Matthew Thorne and Derik Lynch

Independent juries awards

 Amnesty International Film Award: The Burdened by Amr Gamal
 Prizes of the Ecumenical Jury:
 Competition: Tótem by Lila Avilés
 Panorama: Midwives by Léa Fehner
 Forum: Where God Is Not by Mehran Tamadon
 Special Mention: On the Adamant by Nicolas Philibert

 Prize of the FIPRESCI 
 Competition: The Survival of Kindness by Rolf de Heer
 Encounters: Here by Bas Devos
 Panorama: The Quiet Migration (Stille Liv) by Malene Choi
 Forum: Between Revolutions (Între revoluții) by Vlad Petri

 Prize of the Guild of German Art House Cinemas: 20,000 Species of Bees by Estibaliz Urresola Solaguren
 AG KINO GILDE – CINEMA VISION 14plus: And the King Said, What a Fantastic Machine by Axel Danielson, Maximilien Van Aertryck
 Cicae Art Cinema Prizes:
 Panorama: The Teachers’ Lounge by İlker Çatak
 Forum: The Face of Jellyfish by Melisa Liebenthal
 Berliner Morgenpost Reader’s Jury Award: 20,000 Species of Bees by Estibaliz Urresola Solaguren
 Tagesspiegel Reader’s Jury Award: Orlando, My Political Biography by Paul B. Preciado
 Caligari Film Prize: De Facto by Selma Doborac
 Peace Film Prize: Seven Winters in Teheran by Steffi Niederzoll
 ARTEKino International Award: Peeled Skin by Leonie Krippendorff

Notes

References

External links

 
 73rd Berlin International Film Festival at IMDb

73
2023 film festivals
2023 festivals in Europe
2023 in German cinema